Greatest Hits is a greatest hits album by English electronic music band Depeche Mode, released in 1987 by Amiga. It was released exclusively in East Germany on LP and cassette.

Track listing
Side 1:
 "Shake the Disease" – 4:45
 "A Question of Lust" – 4:24
 "It's Called a Heart" – 3:45
 "Blasphemous Rumours" – 5:06
 "Everything Counts" – 3:57
 "People Are People" – 3:43

Side 2:
 "Master and Servant" – 3:50
 "Something to Do" – 3:44
 "Stripped" – 4:13
 "Here Is the House" – 4:16
 "It Doesn't Matter" – 4:45
 "It Doesn't Matter Two" – 2:49

1987 greatest hits albums
Albums produced by Daniel Miller (music producer)
Depeche Mode compilation albums
es:The Singles 81-85#Greatest Hits